Janusz Stanisław Patrzykont (9 May 1912 in Golina – 9 December 1982 in Poznań) was a Polish basketball player who competed in the 1936 Summer Olympics.

He was part of the Polish basketball team, which finished fourth in the Olympic tournament. He played three matches.

References

External links
profile

1912 births
1982 deaths
Polish men's basketball players
Olympic basketball players of Poland
Basketball players at the 1936 Summer Olympics
People from Konin County
Sportspeople from Greater Poland Voivodeship